Borris-in-Ossory (or the 'Burgage of Osraige') is a village in west County Laois, Ireland, close to the Tipperary border and the M7 motorway.

Features
The village has facilities such as a school, churches, community hall, convenience retail outlets and a number of service businesses. The village centre comprises Main Street and includes retail, commercial, institutional, educational and residential functions. Landmark buildings include the Hiberno Romanesque Church of Ireland church of St. Mark, built c.1870, with round tower style bell tower, St. Canice's Church (Roman Catholic), the Ossory of Borris-in-Ossory, and former courthouse. The renovated O’Brien Hall is used as a meeting place for the village's Youth Club and other activities.

Transport

Roads
The village is on the R445 road between the towns of Mountrath (13 km east along the R445) and Roscrea (12 km west). 

During 2009 a motorway junction was constructed to the south of the village in preparation for the westward extension of the M7 motorway. The M7 
bypassed the village on 28 May 2010 at Junction 21.

Buses
The village is served by inter-urban bus links to Dublin, Limerick, Galway, Cork and Carlow, and a town link service connects nearby towns and villages. Long-distance bus passengers were once familiar with Borris-in-Ossory because it served as a refreshment stop, typically 15 minutes at a time.

Rail
Ballybrophy railway station is located approximately 5 km south of the village. The station is on the main Dublin-Cork railway line at its junction with the Limerick–Ballybrophy railway line.

Education
Convent of Mercy National School currently has five classrooms and is currently preparing plans for a new eight classroom school extension. The school was built in 1965.

Religion
Churches in the area include St. Canice's (Roman Catholic) and St. Mark's (Church of Ireland), which are both on Borris-in-Ossory's main street.

Sport
The local Gaelic Athletic Association (GAA) club is Borris-in-Ossory GAA. The Gaelic playing fields are located 1.5 km to the east of the village. The amenities include a playing pitch, dressing and meeting rooms.
In 2011, the village's GAA club team and the nearby Kilcotton team were amalgamated into one team.

People
Christy O'Brien (1933–2022), inter-county hurler
Brian Stanley (b.1961), politician 
J.J. Sheridan (1951–2014), concert pianist, was born in Borris-in-Ossory.

See also
 List of towns and villages in Ireland

References

External links
Official Borris in Ossory NS Website
Borris in Ossory - Lewis Topographical Dictionary, 1837

Towns and villages in County Laois